Bingham is an extinct town in Jeff Davis County, in the U.S. state of Georgia.

History
A post office called Bingham was established in 1894, and remained in operation until 1907. In 1900, the community had 84 inhabitants.

References

Landforms of Jeff Davis County, Georgia